The 2009–10 IUPUI Jaguars men's basketball team represented the Indiana University – Purdue University Indianapolis in the 2009–2010 NCAA Division I basketball season. The Jaguars were coached by Ron Hunter and played their home games at IUPUI Gymnasium, also known as The Jungle in Indianapolis, IN and played three home games plus one exhibition game at Conseco Fieldhouse. The Jaguars are members of The Summit League. They finished the season 25–11, 15–3 in Summit League play and advanced to the championship game of the 2010 The Summit League men's basketball tournament before losing to Oakland. They were invited to the 2010 College Basketball Invitational, only the second time the school has ever participated in a post season tournament, where they advanced to the quarterfinals before losing to Princeton.

Roster
Source

2009-10 Schedule and results
Source
All times are Central

|-
!colspan=9 style=| Exhibition

|-
!colspan=9 style=| Regular Season

|-
!colspan=9 style=| Summit tournament

|-
!colspan=9 style=| CBI

References

Iupui Jaguars
IUPUI Jaguars men's basketball seasons
Iupui
IUPUI
IUPUI